Norwegian group Apoptygma Berzerk have released eight studio albums, three live albums, five compilation albums, three DVDs, 13 EPs, and 20 singles.

Albums

Studio albums

Live albums

Compilation albums

Extended plays

DVDs

Singles

Music videos

Remixes
 Aerodrone – Ready To Love (Apoptygma Berzerk Remix)
 A Split Second – Bury Me In Your Heart (APB Remix)
 a-ha – Lifelines (Apoptygma Berzerk Remix)
 Angst Pop – Ødipus Rex 2012 (Apoptygma Berzerk Dark Club Mix)
 Beborn Beton – Im Innern Einer Frau (Apoptygma Berzerk Mix)
 Cassandra Complex – Twice As Good (Apoptygma Berzerk Rmx)
 Code 64 – Accelerate (Apoptygma Berzerk vs OK Minus remix)
 Echo Image – Endless Day (Club Version - Produced by Apoptygma Berzerk)
 Echo Image – Need To Be Proud (Apoptygma Berzerk Mix)
 Echo Image – Walk My Mind (Apoptygma Berzerk Remix)
 For All The Emptiness – Seduced By A Disease (Apoptygma Berzerk Remix)
 Front 242 – Headhunter 2000 (APB Remix)
 Funker Vogt – Tragic Hero (APB Remix)
 Good Charlotte – The River (Apoptygma Berzerk Remix)
 Good Courage – The World Will Go On (Snowy Norway Mix by APB)
 Goteki – Freebird (Apoptygma Berzerk Remix)
 Hocico – Ruptura (Apoptygma vs. Drugwar Remix)
 Icon of Coil – Repeat It (APB Remix)
 Industrial Heads – Unrated (APB Version)
 JAW – Creature Of Masquerade (APB Remix)
 Leæther Strip – How Do I Know (APB Remix)
 Lights Of Euphoria – Show Me Your Tears (APB vs. Industrial Heads Remix)
 Lost In Desire – I Am You (Apoptygma Berzerk Remix)
 Machinista – Dark Heart Of Me (Apoptygma Berzerk Remix)
 Mortiis – Sins Of Mine (Apoptygma Berzerk Remix)
 Northern Lite – Enemy (Apoptygma Berzerk Remix)
 Nico – All Tomorrow's Parties (Nico Vs. Apoptygma Berzerk) 
 Nitzer Ebb – Once You Say (Remix By Apoptygma Berzerk)
 Page - Krasch (Apoptygma Berzerk Redux)
 Peter Heppner - All Is Shadow (Apoptygma Berzerk Remix)
 Project Pitchfork – Steelrose (APB Remix)
 Remington Super 60 – In Space (Rs60 & Apoptygma Berzerk)
 Sabotage – Who am I (APB Remix)
 Satyricon – The Dawn Of A New Age (APB Remix)
 Scala & Kolacny Brothers – Friday I'm in Love (Remix by Apoptygma Berzerk)
 Sono – Dangerous (Apoptygma Berzerk Mix)
 Switchblade Symphony – Sweet (APB Remix)
 Technomancer – Path of Destruction (Re:Destroyed by Apoptygma Berzerk)
 Tobias Bernstrup – Moments Lost (Apoptygma Berzerk remix)
 The Crüxshadows – Tears (Apoptygma Berzerk Remix)
 The Kovenant – Star by Star (Apoptygma Berzerk Remix)
 Vile Electrodes - Deep Red (Apoptygma Berzerk Remix) 
 VNV Nation – Chrome (Apoptygma Berzerk Remix)
 VNV Nation – Genesis (Apoptygma Berzerk Remix)
 Zeromancer – Something For The Pain (Apoptygma Berzerk Mix)

Side projects
 Germ, Ice Eyes on the Stretch (intro) (1992) (One track released on "Sex, Drugs & EBM" compilation. The track was made with Cadaver guitarist Anders Odden.)
 Germ, 3-track Ultra Limited Demo (Cassette only – 10 numbered and signed copies)
 TB-Moonchild, Divine Penetration [CDS] (1994) ("Hard hitting monotony trance")
  [CDS] (1994) ("Chilled out trance/ambient" with Geir Bratland)
  [CDS] (1995)
 Acid Queen, Bing [EP] (1995)
 Acid Queen, Tranzania (1998) (DJ Applepie (Christian Grimshei), contributions from Jon Erik Martinsen)
 Total Transformation, In Thru Out (1996) ("techno/trance")
 Bruderschaft, Forever [CDS] (2003) (Futurepop dreamteam with DJ Rexx Arkana, Ronan Harris of VNV Nation, Sebastian Komor of Icon of Coil and Joakim Montelius of Covenant)
 Fairlight Children, Before You Came Along [MCD] (2004)
 Fairlight Children, 808 Bit (2004)
 The Kovenant, which Angel joined in 2000, and Geir Bratland in 2003.
 Magenta – Anders Odden's other band.

Projects from former members
 Angst Pop – Ødipus Rex and Panic At T.C.F. (CD on "Sex, Drugs & EBM Sampler) 1992 (former APB keyboardist Per Aksel Lundgreen)
 Angst Pop – Ødipus Rex (Video Version) CD on "Melt Compilation" 1994 (former APB keyboardist Per Aksel Lundgreen)
 Angst Pop – Viva Ta Vie CD on "Electronic Youth Vol. 3" 1994 (former APB keyboardist Per Aksel Lundgreen)
 Cronos Titan, Brides of Christ CD (1995) (former APB keyboardist Per Aksel Lundgreen)
 Cronos Titan, The Gregoraveian EP [EP] (1996) (former APB keyboardist Per Aksel Lundgreen)
 Chinese Detectives – Situation CD-single 1995 (former APB keyboardist Per Aksel Lundgreen)
 Chinese Detectives – Where Do The Boys Go? CD-single 1995 (former APB keyboardist Per Aksel Lundgreen)
 Chinese Detectives – You Think You're A Man CD-Single 1996 (former APB keyboardist Per Aksel Lundgreen)
 Chinese Detectives – Hit That Perfect Beat CD-Single Promo Only 1999 (former APB keyboardist Per Aksel Lundgreen)
 Chinese Detectives – Are Kisses Out Of fashion? CD 1999 (former APB keyboardist Per Aksel Lundgreen)
 Sweep, Sweepeepee (1997) (Jon Erik Martinsen)
 Sweep, Emptiness, Your Loneliness (2001) (Jon Erik Martinsen)
 Sweep, Miss You (2002) (Jon Erik Martinsen)
 Sweep, Two Players (2003) (Jon Erik Martinsen)

Sources: apoptygmaberzerk.de,eyeliners.org, the berzerk web, and the official German fanpage.

References

External links
Apoptygma Berzerk

Discography